Jerome Halvor Granrud  (10 April 1937 – 18 March 2020) was a lieutenant general in the United States Army whose assignments included commander United States Army Japan. He earned a B.A. degree in language studies from the University of Missouri in 1960.

Personal
Granrud married Elizabeth Lillias Fancher on 12 August 1967 in Spokane, Washington. The couple had two children.

References

1937 births
2020 deaths
People from Minot, North Dakota
University of Missouri alumni
United States Army personnel of the Vietnam War
Recipients of the Air Medal
Recipients of the Meritorious Service Medal (United States)
Recipients of the Legion of Merit
United States Army generals